Bilal Erradi (born 22 February 2001) is an Italian professional footballer who plays as a midfielder for Serie D club Sorrento.

Club career
Formed in Pro Vercelli youth system, Erradi made his first team debut for Serie C on 25 September 2019 against Pontedera.

On 15 May 2021, he extended his contract with the club.

On 18 January 2022, he moved to Juve Stabia. Erradi's contract with Juve Stabia was terminated by mutual consent on 18 January 2023.

References

External links
 
 

2001 births
Living people
Italian footballers
Association football midfielders
Serie C players
F.C. Pro Vercelli 1892 players
S.S. Juve Stabia players
A.S.D. Sorrento players